Kapriman (or Sare) is a Sepik language spoken in East Sepik Province, Papua-New Guinea. Alternative names are Mugumute, Wasare.

Phonology

Alamblak also has the same vowel system.

References

Bahinemo languages
Languages of East Sepik Province